Amselina parapsesta is a moth of the family Autostichidae. It is found in Asia Minor.

The wingspan is 14–17 mm. It is very similar to Amselina emir, but the greyish irroration (speckling) is denser and the indistinct spot is larger.

References

Moths described in 1986
Amselina
Insects of Turkey